David Lamont McQueen Smith (born 6 July 1903, date of death unknown) was a Scottish professional football goalkeeper who made over 100 appearances in the Scottish League for Queen of the South. He also played in the Scottish League for Hamilton Academical, Mid-Annandale and Albion Rovers and in the Football League for Gillingham and Brentford.

Career statistics

References

1903 births
Year of death missing
Scottish footballers
Footballers from Coatbridge
Gillingham F.C. players
Brentford F.C. players
Hamilton Academical F.C. players
English Football League players
Scottish Football League players
Association football goalkeepers
Albion Rovers F.C. players
Queen of the South F.C. players
Nithsdale Wanderers F.C. players
Mid-Annandale F.C. players
Pollok F.C. players
Scottish Junior Football Association players